Shewketjan Tayir (born 11 May 2001) is a Chinese footballer currently playing as a defender for Wuhan Three Towns.

Club career
Shewketjan Tayir would join lower league side Xinjiang Snowland in November 2019 before gaining the attention of the Chinese U19 team. In the 2021 China League Two season the Chinese U20 team were invited to participate within the Chinese pyramid and Shewketjan was loaned out to them. He would make his debut for them in a Chinese FA Cup game on 13 October 2021 against Dalian Professional in a 2-1 defeat.    

On 27 April 2022, he signed with newly promoted top tier side Wuhan Three Towns. He would go on to make his debut on 17 November 2022, in a Chinese FA Cup game against Dandong Tengyue, which ended in a 5-1 victory. After the game he would go on to establish himself as a squad player within the team that won the 2022 Chinese Super League title.

Career statistics
.

Honours

Club
Wuhan Three Towns
Chinese Super League: 2022.

References

External links 
 

2001 births
Living people
Chinese footballers
China youth international footballers
Footballers from Xinjiang
Uyghur sportspeople
Association football defenders